Mapeley Limited is a Guernsey-based outsourcing and property investment business. It was previously listed on the London Stock Exchange and constituent of the FTSE 250 Index.

History
The company was founded in 1999. In 2001, it entered into an outsourcing contract with HM Revenue & Customs. In 2000 it purchased a portfolio of properties from Abbey and then leased them back again to Abbey. Then in 2006 it secured a major outsourcing contract from the Identity and Passport Service.

Operations
The company has operations organised as follows:
 Outsourcing - contracts with HM Revenue & Customs, Abbey and the Identity and Passport Service
 Direct property investments - individual property portfolios

Ownership
Fortress Investment Group owns c. 51.4% of the company.

References

External links
 Official site

Companies formerly listed on the London Stock Exchange
Business services companies established in 1999
1999 establishments in British Overseas Territories